was the thirty-sixth of the sixty-nine stations of the Nakasendō, as well as the fourth of eleven stations on the Kisoji. It is located in the present-day town of Kiso, in the Kiso District of Nagano Prefecture, Japan.

History
Miyanokoshi was the childhood home of Minamoto no Yoshinaka, and there are still many ruins and artifacts related to him to be found in the town. Additionally, it was the birthplace for many Kiso-area carpenters.

Neighboring Post Towns
Nakasendō & Kisoji
Yabuhara-juku - Miyanokoshi-juku - Fukushima-juku

References

Stations of the Nakasendō
Stations of the Nakasendo in Nagano Prefecture